Ludwig Eugen, Duke of Württemberg (6 January 1731 – 20 May 1795), was the reigning Duke of Württemberg from 1793 until his death in 1795.

Early life and ancestry  
He was born as the third son of Duke Karl Alexander and his wife, Princess Maria Augusta of Thurn and Taxis (11 August 1706 – 1 February 1756).

His maternal grandparents were Anselm Franz, 2nd Prince of Thurn and Taxis (30 January 1681 – 8 November 1739) and Princess Maria Ludovika Anna von Lobkowicz (20 October 1683 – 20 January 1750). Maria Ludovika was daughter of Prince Ferdinand August Leopold von Lobkowicz-Sagan (1655–1715) and Princess Maria Anna Wilhelmine of Baden-Baden (1655-1702).

Maria Anna was a daughter of William, Margrave of Baden-Baden (1593–1677) and Countess Maria Magdalena of Oettingen-Baldern (1619-1688). Her paternal grandparents were Edward Fortunatus, Margrave of Baden-Rodemachern (1565–1600) and Baroness Maria of Eicken (1569-1636).

Edward was a son of Christopher II, Margrave of Baden-Rodemachern (1537–1575) and Princess Cecilia of Sweden (1540–1627). Cecilia was a daughter of Gustav I of Sweden (1496–1560) and Margaret Leijonhufvud (1516–1551).

Marriage 
He married (initially morganatically) Countess Sophie Albertine von Beichlingen (15 December 1728 – 10 May 1807), a daughter of August Gottfried Dietrich, Count of Beichlingen (1703–1769) and Sophie Helene, Baroness of Stöcken (1710–1738).  Louis and Sophie had three daughters:
 Sophie Antoinette (29 June 1763 – 12 May 1775)
 Wilhelmine Friederike Elisabeth (3 July 1764 – 9 August 1817), married Prince Kraft Ernst von Oettingen-Oettingen und Oettingen-Wallerstein (3 Aug 1748 – 6 Oct 1802)
 Henriette Charlotte Friederike (11 March 1767 – 23 May 1817), married Prince Karl Joseph von Hohenlohe-Bartenstein-Jagstberg (12 Dec 1766 – 6 Jul 1838)

Reign 
He succeeded his brother Karl Eugen as Duke of Württemberg in 1793, and reigned until his own death in 1795, when he was succeeded by his younger brother Frederick Eugen.

References

External links

1731 births
1795 deaths
18th-century dukes of Württemberg
People from Frankfurt
Knights of the Golden Fleece